Plawangan is a hill above the town of Kaliurang, on the southern slopes of Gunung Merapi, in Sleman Regency, Special Region of Yogyakarta, Indonesia. It is east of Turgo, which is another named hill above Kaliurang.

Formerly a vulcanological post of the Indonesian volcanology service, it was abandoned in the 1990s following serious southerly nuee ardente and gas clouds. Under its western side are large man-made caves and tunnels, said by locals to have been made under the orders of Japanese military administrators during World War II.

It is also located within the Plawangan Turgo nature reserve an almost 200 hectares on the slope of Merapi that has rare animals and plants occurring in its area.

External links
 Context in 1994 eruption of Merapi

References

Mountains of Indonesia
Sleman Regency
Mount Merapi